Langobardia or Longobardia may refer to:
 the Byzantine thema of Longobardia, which initially included the areas of southern Italy not occupied by Lombard and later also those occupied by this Germanic people (mainly the areas corresponding to the current regions Apulia and Basilicata); known in the Old High German: Langbardland.
 Langobardia Minor, which included the two duchies of central-southern Italy of Spoleto and Benevento
 Langobardia Major, which included the Lombard duchies of northern Italy and Tuscia